The Schoeman Park Open  was a golf tournament on the South African Tour from the 1969/1970 season to the 1973/1974 season. It was held in February or March, except that the 1971/1972 event was held in December. The event was held at Schoeman Park Golf Club in Bloemfontein, South Africa.

Winners

References 

Golf tournaments in South Africa
Former Sunshine Tour events